Brad Lawrence is an American entrepreneur and artist.

Overview 

Brad Lawrence is the founder of the psychedelic art company Black Light Visuals. In 2011, Lawrence graduated from College for Creative Studies in Detroit with a Bachelor of Fine Arts degree. Lawrence specialized in hyperrealism charcoal drawings, but only completed two pieces after college before he developed acute tendonitis in both arms. The end of Lawrence's drawing career sparked his interest in other forms of art. Inspired by his father's classic black light screen printing shop, Lawrence began to experiment in abstract black light art. This led him to discover a new method of traditional paper marbling, which he began to market with paintings on clothing items, such as shirts, hats, and shoes. These items later became the source of income for his independently-owned apparel and body marbling company, Black Light Visuals.

College for Creative Studies 
Born in Michigan on October 22, 1989, Lawrence developed an interest in art, and later received a scholarship from College for Creative Studies (CCS) in Detroit. During Lawrence's enrollment at CCS, he focused on his drawing experience, and also studied abroad in Ireland. The aftermath of his experience in Ireland is what eventually inspired him to experiment with black light art. “I developed a duality in my aesthetic when I returned from Ireland,” Lawrence explained. “After spending four months doing charcoals, I craved the reintroduction of color to my work. My dad had been screen printing ultra-violet tapestries for decades, but I had not previously embraced the media in my own work.”

While working on a commissioned set of hyperrealism pieces, Lawrence began to experience pain in his arms from the long hours at the drawing board. After his diagnosis revealed tendonitis as the cause of his pain, he began delving further into the ultraviolet world of abstract painting. The bottles used to apply drops of paint on the fluid surface reduced the pain in his arms, and he began marketing his work at small gallery shows and electronic dance music (EDM) events in the Detroit area before turning his black light art into his own company.

Black Light Visuals 

Black Light Visuals, or BLVisuals for short, is an alternative black light body paint and apparel company. The company's markets itself through EDM festivals. The company specializes in a process they call body marbling: a painting technique that applies droplets of paint to a fluid surface. This allows the colors to expand and contract naturally on the fluid. The colors can also be manipulated into different designs by pulling a needle or other thin object vertically through the surface. Lawrence's process differs from many traditional marbling styles, and uses only materials and compounds that are safe on skin and clothing. The varying tensions between each color keep the different hues separated, and the result is a swirling, psychedelic painting that they transfer on to clothing or skin.

Other 
In addition to his own art, Lawrence has also assisted in curating student work for Scholastic Art and Writing Awards, which allows high school students to showcase their work, win scholarships, and gain experience working with established artists and writers in the field. Lawrence has also spoken as a Scholastics Keynote Speaker, in which he delivered a speech to the young awardees about their pursuit of art prior to the award ceremony, held at the Detroit Film Theater.

References

American entertainment industry businesspeople
Living people
Year of birth missing (living people)
Place of birth missing (living people)